Tambora is a subdistrict of West Jakarta, Indonesia. Tambora Subdistrict is bounded by a railway to the west and to the north, Kali Krukut - Kali Besar canal to the east, and Duri Selatan Road to the south.

The Roa Malaka Administrative Village of the Tambora Subdistrict contains the southwestern area of Jakarta Old Town, the area on the west side of Kali Besar Canal. The area of Jakarta Old Town that was located within Tambora are generally residential areas. Notable colonial buildings are located along the Kali Besar Canal, most of them are former palaces or houses dating from the 18th century. These buildings are now mostly used as offices.

Kelurahan (Administrative Villages)
The subdistrict of Tambora is divided into eleven kelurahan or administrative villages:
Tanah Sareal - area code 11210 
Tambora - area code 11220 
Roa Malaka - area code 11230 
Pekojan - area code  11240 
Jembatan Lima - area code 11250 
Krendang - area code 11260 
Duri Utara - area code 11270 
Duri Selatan - area code  11270 
Kali Anyar - area code 11310 
Jembatan Besi - area code 11320 
Angke - area code 11330

List of important places

 Angke Mosque, located in Angke Administrative Village, is the only mosque in Jakarta that has remained unaltered since it was built.
Masjid Al-Anshor, which is arguably the oldest mosque in Jakarta.
Jami Kampung Baru Inpak Mosque
 Former Chartered Bank 
 Omni Batavia Hotel
 Toko Merah
 Malacca Gallery

References

External links

 Official site

West Jakarta